The 2012 Formula Renault 3.5 Series was the eighth season of the Renault–supported single–seater category.

It was the first season for the new Dallara T12 chassis, which featured a new,  V8 engine supplied by British firm Zytek Motorsport. The car also featured a new gearbox developed by Ricardo and a Drag Reduction System similar to the one first used in the 2011 Formula One season. The series' organising committee has also announced that the series' sporting regulations were set to remain unchanged.

Robin Frijns won the championship in his first season of competition, becoming the first driver (since Robert Kubica in 2005) to win the Formula Renault 3.5 Series in his debut year. Tech 1 Racing won the teams' championship for the fourth time.

Teams and drivers
On 10 October 2011, it was announced that 18 teams had applied to compete in the 2012 season. Twelve of the thirteen teams that competed in 2011 submitted entries, while Mofaz Racing withdrew after failing to acquire the requisite funds to continue in the series. Several new teams, including Arden International, Atech Reid GP, DAMS, Koiranen Motorsport, Max Travin Racing Team – however prior the start of the season, Max Travin Racing Team joined forces with BVM Target as part of a three-year partnership – and Van Amersfoort Racing all submitted entries to join the series. The final list of thirteen teams was published on 17 October 2011, with GP2 Series teams Arden International and DAMS selected to join, while EPIC Racing and Koiranen Motorsport were placed on a reserve list.

Driver changes
Changed teams
 Arthur Pic switched from Tech 1 Racing to newcomers DAMS for the 2012 campaign.
 Jake Rosenzweig moved from Mofaz Racing to join ISR for the 2012 season.
 Alexander Rossi, who finished third in the 2011 season for Fortec Motorsports, moved to the new team Arden Caterham for the 2012 campaign.

Entering/Re–Entering FR3.5
 2010 champion Mikhail Aleshin, who competed in the GP2 Series and German Formula Three in 2011, returned to the series full-time with Team RFR, after a one-off appearance at the Hungaroring in 2011, replacing Anton Nebylitskiy. Nebylitskiy partners Aleshin at Team RFR in 2012.
 Zoël Amberg, who competed in the 2011 GP3 Series season with ATECH CRS GP, moved to Formula Renault 3.5, joining Pons Racing.
 Jules Bianchi, who finished third in the GP2 Series in both 2010 and 2011, joined Tech 1 Racing. He also competed in the Monaco round of the series in 2009 for SG Formula.
 Sam Bird, who was sixth in GP2 in 2011, also joined the series with ISR.
 Yann Cunha, who participated in both British Formula 3 and the European F3 Open championships in 2011, joined Amberg at Pons Racing.
 Lucas Foresti, who graduated from the British Formula 3 Championship, joined Arthur Pic at DAMS.
 Colombian driver Carlos Huertas, who placed third in the British Formula 3 championship and fifth in the Macau Grand Prix, will move into the series, driving for Fortec Motorsport. Eurocup Formula Renault 2.0 champion Robin Frijns became his teammate.
 British Formula 3 runner-up Kevin Magnussen continued his collaboration with Carlin Motorsport for another season, joining the team's Formula Renault 3.5 outfit. He was joined in the team by Will Stevens, who placed fourth in the Formula Renault Eurocup in 2011.
 Nikolay Martsenko, who finished twelfth in German Formula Three in 2011, moved into the series with BVM Target.
 Lotus signed German Formula Three champion Richie Stanaway and runner-up Marco Sørensen to drive their cars in 2012.
 Auto GP race-winner Giovanni Venturini joined Martsenko at BVM Target.
 GP3 Series race-winner Lewis Williamson moved into the series full-time, after replacing Daniel Ricciardo at ISR for two meetings in 2011. He joined Formula Renault 3.5 debutants Arden Caterham. Fellow GP3 race-winner Nico Müller joined the series with International Draco Racing.
 GP3 racer Nick Yelloly, who competed in three meetings for Pons Racing in 2011, moved into the series full-time with Comtec Racing. He will be joined by fellow GP3 driver Vittorio Ghirelli.

Leaving FR3.5
 Nathanaël Berthon, who raced for ISR in 2011, stepped up to GP2 with Racing Engineering, having previously contested the 2011 GP2 Asia Series season and GP2 Final with the team.
 Albert Costa, who finished fourth in 2011 with EPIC Racing, will move to the Eurocup Mégane Trophy with defending champions Oregon Team.
 Daniël de Jong, who finished 29th for Comtec Racing, joined the Auto GP World Series full-time with Manor MP Motorsport, having contested three meetings for the team during the 2011 season.
 Daniel McKenzie, who raced for Comtec Racing in 2011, will move to Formula Two for 2012.
 Sten Pentus, who finished 24th in 2011 with EPIC Racing, will move to the Auto GP World Series with the Virtuosi UK team.
 After finishing in fifth place in the series, alongside a half season in Formula One, Daniel Ricciardo switched to Formula One full-time, joining Scuderia Toro Rosso.
 Stéphane Richelmi, who finished 26th in the 2011 season for Draco Racing, will graduate to the GP2 Series with Trident Racing.
 Filip Salaquarda, who entered at Monza with Pons Racing in 2011, will switch to the FIA GT1 World Championship, joining AF Corse.
 Adrien Tambay, who competed for Pons Racing and Draco Racing in 2011, will join the DTM, driving for Abt Sportsline.
 Mofaz Racing driver Chris van der Drift left the championship to compete in the Auto GP World Series.
 2011 series runner-up Jean-Éric Vergne moved into Formula One with Scuderia Toro Rosso.
 Oliver Webb, who drove for Pons Racing in 2011, will move to the Indy Lights series full-time with Sam Schmidt Motorsports, having contested four races with Jensen MotorSport in 2011.
 2011 champion Robert Wickens switched to the DTM, joining the junior Mercedes scheme, earning a place at Mücke Motorsport.
 BVM Target driver Daniel Zampieri switched to sportscar racing, joining the International GT Open and Blancpain Endurance Series with the Kessel Racing team.

Mid-season changes
 Richie Stanaway injured his back in an accident during the third round at Spa-Francorchamps, and was forced to miss the remainder of the season. He was replaced by César Ramos, who drove for Fortec during the 2011 season. Ramos was replaced by GP2 Series driver Nigel Melker after Moscow.
 Giovanni Venturini left BVM Target due to a lack of funding. He was replaced by Auto GP World Series and Italian Formula Three driver Sergey Sirotkin for his home round in Moscow. Due to Sirotkin's contract commitments to Euronova Racing, Daniel Zampieri made a comeback to the championship at Silverstone.
 Lewis Williamson lost his drive with Arden Caterham, after he was dropped from the Red Bull Junior Team. He was replaced by GP3 Series driver António Félix da Costa.

Race calendar and results
In August 2011, series organisers had announced that the championship was due to visit Russia and Brazil during the 2012 season. The 2012 calendar was announced on 10 October 2011, the day after the end of the 2011 season. Russia was included, but Brazil omitted.

Championship standings
Points system
Points are awarded to the top 10 classified finishers.

Drivers' Championship

Teams' Championship

References

External links
  World Series by Renault
 Renault-Sport official website

Formula Renault 3.5
Formula Renault 3.5
World Series Formula V8 3.5 seasons
Renault 3.5